Foad Mostafa Soltani (1948 – 31 August 1979) was one of the founders of the Revolutionary Organisation of the Toilers of Kurdistan, popularly known as Komala.

References

1948 births
1979 deaths
Kurdish atheists
Iranian Marxists
Iranian revolutionaries
Komala Party of Iranian Kurdistan politicians
Kurdish communists
Kurdish Marxists
Kurdish nationalists
Kurdish revolutionaries
Kurdish socialists
People of the Iranian Revolution
Sharif University of Technology alumni
Kurdish independence activists